Kenegut is a settlement in Kenya's Rift Valley Province.
It has an elevation of 1,967 meters. It is located northwest of Singoronik.

References 

Populated places in Rift Valley Province